Michael Bissex (born 28 September 1944) is a former English first-class cricketer. He played with Gloucestershire County Cricket Club for his entire career, from 1961 to 1972.

In 1966-67 he toured Pakistan with the MCC Under-25 side, and in 1968 he represented England's Under-25 side.

External links
 
Cricket Archive

1944 births
Living people
English cricketers
Gloucestershire cricketers
Sportspeople from Bath, Somerset
Cheshire cricketers
Cornwall cricketers
Marylebone Cricket Club Under-25s cricketers